The Romanian Classic is a darts tournament.

List of winners

Men's

Women's

Tournament records

 Most wins Jamie Hughes:2, 2015 and 2016 
 Most Finals Jamie Hughes:2, 2015 and 2016
 Most Semi Finals Jamie Hughes, James Hurrell:2
 Most Quarter Finals Willem Mandigers: 3
 Most Appearances Willem Mandigers: 4 
 Most Prize Money won €1,500: .
 Best winning average (.) : , .
 Youngest Winner age 15: Luke Littler
 Oldest Winner age 43: Scott Mitchell

See also
List of BDO ranked tournaments
List of WDF tournaments

References

2014 establishments in Romania
Darts tournaments